Bakerville is an unincorporated community in Logan County, Illinois, United States. Bakerville is northeast of Mount Pulaski.

References

Unincorporated communities in Logan County, Illinois
Unincorporated communities in Illinois